P. Cohen may refer to:

Patrick Cohen, actor featured in the webseries, We Need Girlfriends
Patrick Cohen, pianist featured in performances with Austrian  string quartet Quatuor Mosaïques
Paul Cohen (disambiguation)
Peter Cohen (disambiguation)
Peter Cohen (director)
Philip Cohen (disambiguation)
Pierre Cohen, French politician